William Winstead Thomas (1848–1904) was an American insurance company president and an architect.

He was president of the Southern Mutual Insurance Company.

Several of his works are listed on the U.S. National Register of Historic Places for their architecture.

He designed the Octagon Mode Seney-Stovall Chapel, a $10,000 structure octagonal red brick building funded by George I. Seney.

His architectural works include:
Jackson County Courthouse (1879), Jefferson, Georgia, one of his earlier works, NRHP-listed
Seney-Stovall Chapel (1882–85), Lucy Cobb Institute Campus, 200 N. Milledge Ave., University of Georgia campus Athens, Georgia (Thomas, W.W.), NRHP-listed
Oconee County Courthouse (no longer extant)
Thomas-Carithers House, 530 S. Milledge Ave. Athens, Georgia, NRHP-listed 
White Hall, Whitehall and Simonton Bridge Rds., outside Atlanta in Whitehall, Georgia, NRHP-listed.  One of his most notable residential works.
McDaniel-Tichenor House, 319 McDaniel St. Monroe, Georgia, NRHP-listed 
One or more works in NRHP-listed McDaniel Street Historic District, S. Broad and McDaniel Streets, Monroe, Georgia

References

Architects from Georgia (U.S. state)
1848 births
1904 deaths
American businesspeople in insurance
19th-century American architects
19th-century American businesspeople